Grigory Mkrtychevich Mkrtychan (3 January 1925 – 14 February 2003) was a Soviet and Russian ice hockey goalkeeper who played in the Soviet Hockey League. He won an Olympic gold medal in 1956, the world title in 1954 and 1956 (combined with Olympics), and the European title in 1954–56. In retirement he worked as a head coach of Lokomotiv Moscow in 1960–62, and later took various administrative positions with Soviet and Russian sports committees; he also served as an ice hockey referee and official. He is a member of the Russian Ice Hockey Hall of Fame.

References

External links

 Russian and Soviet Hockey Hall of Fame bio

1925 births
2003 deaths
HC CSKA Moscow players
Ice hockey players at the 1956 Winter Olympics
Medalists at the 1956 Winter Olympics
Olympic gold medalists for the Soviet Union
Olympic ice hockey players of the Soviet Union
Olympic medalists in ice hockey
Russian people of Armenian descent
Ice hockey people from Moscow
Russian ice hockey goaltenders
Ethnic Armenian sportspeople
Soviet ice hockey goaltenders
Ice hockey executives
Soviet sports administrators
Sportspeople from Krasnodar